Henry Bartelmann House, also known as the Henry Geisecke House, is a historic home located at Washington, Franklin County, Missouri. It was built about 1860, and is a two-story, three bay, side entry brick dwelling on a stone foundation.  It has a side-gable roof and tall brick jack arched door and window openings.

It was listed on the National Register of Historic Places in 2000.

References

Houses on the National Register of Historic Places in Missouri
Houses completed in 1860
Buildings and structures in Franklin County, Missouri
National Register of Historic Places in Franklin County, Missouri